This is a list of mayors of Madison, Wisconsin.

Village presidents

Mayors

See also
Mayoral elections in Madison, Wisconsin

References

Madison
 list